County Route 552 (CR 552) is a county highway in the U.S. state of New Jersey. The highway extends  from Laurel Street (Cumberland County Route 606) in Bridgeton to Harding Highway (U.S. Route 40) in Hamilton Township.

Route description 

CR 552 begins at an intersection with CR 606 in Bridgeton, Cumberland County, heading east on two-lane undivided Irving Avenue. At the next intersection, the route crosses Route 77 and passes homes and businesses, crossing a Winchester and Western Railroad line before reaching intersections with CR 669 and CR 638 in more residential surroundings. A short distance after the CR 638 intersection, the road crosses into Upper Deerfield Township and enters more rural areas of development, turning east into a mix of farms and woods at the CR 654 junction. CR 552 crosses CR 553 before entering Deerfield Township, where the route intersects CR 675 and CR 705. The road enters more forested areas before passing homes as it intersects CR 682, CR 634, and CR 608. At this point, CR 552 turns to the northeast onto Sherman Avenue and passes farms to the north and forests to the south, reaching junctions with CR 717 and CR 636.

The route curves east into forested areas as it enters Vineland and crosses the Maurice River. CR 552 reaches an interchange with the Route 55 freeway before passing Inspira Medical Center Vineland and crossing CR 628. The road heads through a mix of woods and businesses as it comes to the Route 47 junction. From here, the route passes a mix of farms, woods, and homes as it intersects CR 615 at the crossing of Conrail Shared Assets Operations' Vineland Secondary. CR 552 continues through more wooded areas of homes as it crosses CR 555 and CR 655, turning southeast at the intersection with the latter. The route turns south at the CR 673 junction and passes through forests as it comes to an intersection with CR 552 Spur. At this point, CR 552 turns east-northeast onto Mays Landing Road and continues through dense forest with some homes, crossing CR 671 and turning east. After crossing the Manumuskin River, the road heads into Maurice River Township and runs through more rural areas.

CR 552 enters Buena Vista Township in Atlantic County  and heads northeast through wooded areas with residences as Broad Street, crossing CR 557 and the Beesleys Point Secondary railroad line operated by the Cape May Seashore Lines railroad. The road continues into Hamilton Township and heads east into forested areas with a few areas of homes. CR 552 continues east to its terminus at an intersection with US 40 in commercial areas.

Major intersections

Special routes 

County Route 552 Spur extends  from Third Street (CR 555) in Millville to Sherman Avenue (CR 552) in Vineland.

See also

References

External links 

New Jersey 5xx Routes (Dan Moraseski)

552
552
552